Marko Živković (born 3 May 1999) is a Croatian footballer who most recently played as a goalkeeper for Casertana

Career

Dinamo Zagreb 

Živković was Member of Dinamo Zagreb 11 Years and in their U-17 team and U-19 team.

Casertana 

Živković made 2 appearances for Casertana in 2019–20 season in a 2–1 win against Bisceglie and 2–0 loss against Catanzaro.

References

External links
 Marko Živković on SofaScore
 Marko Živković on fmtransferupdate

1999 births
Living people
Footballers from Zagreb
Association football goalkeepers
Croatian footballers
Casertana F.C. players
Croatian expatriate footballers
Expatriate footballers in Italy
Croatian expatriate sportspeople in Italy